Rice Evan Graves, Jr. (June 23, 1838  September 20, 1863) was an artillery officer in the Confederate States Army during the American Civil War. He was killed in the Battle of Chickamauga.

Early years
Graves was born in Rockbridge, Virginia but grew up near Yelvington, Daviess County, Kentucky (12 miles east of Owensboro, Kentucky) after a near tragedy in 1844 interrupted his family's planned move to St. Louis. His parents, wealthy planter Rice E. Graves, Sr. and his wife Amelia Rucker Gregory (widowed daughter of American Revolutionary War Patriot Cpt. Jesee Richeson), had booked passage on the riverboat "Star of the West". With their family and all their worldly possessions on board, they began the journey down the Ohio River to Missouri and a new life. Just below Breckinridge County, Kentucky, the "Star of the West" collided with the "Hark-Away" and sank. The frantic parents saved themselves and their eight children. However, everything they owned was lost. They decided to remain in Cloverport, where the father rented a farm.

When they were financially able, the family moved to Daviess County where they to purchased land and improved it. By that time, the number of children in the household had increased to eleven and with so large a family, education opportunities were limited. All of the children were expected to help out with the farm work, so their schooling was done locally. The young Graves spent three semesters at the Owensboro Academy.

West Point cadet

Rice E. Graves was a cadet at the United States Military Academy at West Point, New York through a scholarship presented by Congressman Samuel O. Peyton representing the second Congressional district of Kentucky. A member of the class of 1863; he resigned his Presidential appointment in 1861 to join the Confederate States of America Army. The two years he spent in West Point set the standard for his later military career.

Confederate States Army
Graves enlistment in the 2nd Kentucky Infantry at Camp Boone, Tennessee, quickly becoming the regimental adjutant. In November 1861 he was promoted to Captain and appointed to command Graves' Battery, an artillery unit attached to the regiment. Gaining a reputation as skillful artillery leader he was promoted to the rank of Major in October 1862. He served as the divisional Chief of Artillery under the command of General John C. Breckinridge.
Graves  served in many civil war battles and campaigns to include the battle at Fort Donelson, TN, Battle of Shiloh; Siege of Vicksburg; Battle of Stones River at Murfreesboro, TN (where he was twice wounded) and the Battle of Jackson, MS.

Death

Graves was mortally wounded in action at the Battle of Chickamauga on September 20, 1863. Little was recorded of Maj. Graves after the first night at the field hospital, but it is thought that he lived longer than hours after his wounding. Apparently he was still alive when Breckinridge's troops left the area or else his body would have been transported along with Gen. Helm to Atlanta for burial. There were several hospitals set up in the nearby town, Ringgold, and he most likely perished in one of them a day or two later. He was buried in the Citizen's Cemetery in Ringgold. Sadly, the exact burial location of Maj. Graves was lost through the years.

General John C. Breckinridge wrote of Major Graves in his official report of the battle: "One member of my staff I cannot thank; Major Rice Graves received a mortal wound on the (Sunday morning)(September) 20th (1863). Although a very young man he gave promise of the highest distinction. A truer friend, a purer patriot, a better soldier, never lived".

Tribute
On September 21, 1900, the Breckinridge Chapter of the Owensboro, KY UDC unveiled the first Confederate monument by the organization in Kentucky. C.H. Todd, Commander of the Rice E. Graves United Confederate Veterans Camp #1121 said that he "could recall no other soldier that he met during the war who so impressed him and so rapidly won his confidence and friendship." A military grave marker for Major Graves was erected on the anniversary of his death in 1996 by members of the General Ben Hardin Helm Sons of Confederate Veterans Camp in the center of the Ringgold cemetery.

See also

 Graves' Battery
 Orphan Brigade
 Kentucky in the Civil War

References

1838 births
1863 deaths
People from Daviess County, Kentucky
People from Rockbridge County, Virginia
People of Kentucky in the American Civil War
Orphan Brigade
Confederate States Army officers
Confederate States of America military personnel killed in the American Civil War
United States Military Academy alumni
People from Breckinridge County, Kentucky